The WPT Five Diamond World Poker Classic is an annual tournament as part of the World Poker Tour that is played out at Bellagio Resort & Casino in Las Vegas, Nevada. It has been part of every season of the World Poker Tour after being the inaugural event in Season 1 (I) in 2002.

History 
The World Poker Tour's first-ever event was the WPT Five Diamond World Poker Classic that began on May 27, 2002. Gus Hansen was crowned the first champion and also became the first player to final table this event twice when he finished third in Season 2 (II) behind eventual winner Paul Phillips. Season 2 (II) would see the date of the event shifted to December where it currently remains on the schedule every season. In Season 3 (III) the buy-in was raised from $10,200 to $15,300 and Daniel Negreanu won the event.

The $15,000 buy-in remained through to Season 8 (VIII) before it was reduced back to $10,000. In Season 9 (IX), Antonio Esfandiari won the event which would be the first of his three consecutive final table appearances as he finished sixth in Season 10 (X) and fourth in Season 11 (XI). Andrew Lichtenberger also has three final tables in this event with two coming back-to-back in Season 10 (X) and Season 11 (XI).

Two players have both won an event and finished runner-up. Ryan Tosoc finished second in Season 15 (XV) before winning in Season 16 (XVI), while Alex Foxen finished second in Season 16 (XVI) before winning in Season 18 (XVIII).

The event was moved to October for Season 20 (XX), which was the first time it wasn't held in December since the inaugural season. Chad Eveslage won his second WPT title and $1,042,300 after he defeated Steve Buckner.

From Season 16 (XVI), the final tables were streamed on PokerGO.

Event winners

Event results

Season 1 (I): WPT Five Diamond World Poker Classic 

 5-Day Event: May 27-June 1, 2002
 Buy-in: $10,200
 Number of Entrants: 146
 Total Prize Pool: $1,416,200
 Number of Payouts: 18
 Winning Hand:

Season 2 (II): WPT Five Diamond World Poker Classic 

 4-Day Event: December 15–18, 2003
 Buy-in: $10,200
 Number of Entrants: 314
 Total Prize Pool: $3,044,750
 Number of Payouts: 36
 Winning Hand:

Season 3 (III): WPT Five Diamond World Poker Classic 

 5-Day Event: December 14–18, 2004
 Buy-in: $15,300
 Number of Entrants: 376
 Total Prize Pool: $5,470,800
 Number of Payouts: 50
 Winning Hand:

Season 4 (IV): WPT Five Diamond World Poker Classic 

 5-Day Event: December 12–16, 2005
 Buy-in: $15,300
 Number of Entrants: 555
 Total Prize Pool: $8,075,250
 Number of Payouts: 100
 Winning Hand:

Season 5 (V): WPT Five Diamond World Poker Classic 

 6-Day Event: December 14–19, 2006
 Buy-in: $15,400
 Number of Entrants: 583
 Total Prize Pool: $8,482,650
 Number of Payouts: 100
 Winning Hand:

Season 6 (VI): WPT Five Diamond World Poker Classic 

 7-Day Event: December 12–18, 2007
 Buy-in: $15,400
 Number of Entrants: 626
 Total Prize Pool: $9,390,000
 Number of Payouts: 100
 Winning Hand:

Season 7 (VII): WPT Five Diamond World Poker Classic 

 7-Day Event: December 13–19, 2008
 Buy-in: $15,400
 Number of Entrants: 497
 Total Prize Pool: $7,231,350
 Number of Payouts: 100
 Winning Hand:

Season 8 (VIII): WPT Five Diamond World Poker Classic 

 7-Day Event: December 13–19, 2009
 Buy-in: $15,400
 Number of Entrants: 329
 Total Prize Pool: $4,761,450
 Number of Payouts: 27
 Winning Hand:

Season 9 (IX): WPT Five Diamond World Poker Classic 

 6-Day Event: December 3–8, 2010
 Buy-in: $10,300
 Number of Entrants: 438
 Total Prize Pool: $4,261,267
 Number of Payouts: 100
 Winning Hand:

Season 10 (X): WPT Five Diamond World Poker Classic 

 6-Day Event: December 6–11, 2011
 Buy-in: $10,300
 Number of Entrants: 413
 Total Prize Pool: $4,006,100
 Number of Payouts: 100
 Winning Hand:

Season 11 (XI): WPT Five Diamond World Poker Classic 

 6-Day Event: December 4–9, 2012
 Buy-in: $10,300
 Number of Entrants: 503
 Total Prize Pool: $4,879,100
 Number of Payouts: 54
 Winning Hand:

Season 12 (XII): WPT Five Diamond World Poker Classic 

 6-Day Event: December 6–11, 2013
 Buy-in: $10,300
 Number of Entrants: 449
 Total Prize Pool: $4,355,300
 Number of Payouts: 45
 Winning Hand:

Season 13 (XIII): WPT Five Diamond World Poker Classic 

 6-Day Event: December 15–20, 2014
 Buy-in: $10,300
 Number of Entrants: 586
 Total Prize Pool: $5,684,200
 Number of Payouts: 54
 Winning Hand:

Season 14 (XIV): WPT Five Diamond World Poker Classic 

 6-Day Event: December 14–19, 2015
 Buy-in: $10,400
 Number of Entrants: 639
 Total Prize Pool: $6,198,300
 Number of Payouts: 63
 Winning Hand:

Season 15 (XV): WPT Five Diamond World Poker Classic 

 6-Day Event: December 5–10, 2016
 Buy-in: $10,400
 Number of Entrants: 791
 Total Prize Pool: $7,672,700
 Number of Payouts: 72
 Winning Hand:

Season 16 (XVI): WPT Five Diamond World Poker Classic 

 6-Day Event: December 5–10, 2017
 Buy-in: $10,400
 Number of Entrants: 812
 Total Prize Pool: $7,876,400
 Number of Payouts: 81
 Winning Hand:

Season 17 (XVII): WPT Five Diamond World Poker Classic 

 5-Day Event: December 11–15, 2018
 Buy-in: $10,400
 Number of Entrants: 1,001
 Total Prize Pool: $9,709,700
 Number of Payouts: 126
 Winning Hand:

Season 18 (XVIII): WPT Five Diamond World Poker Classic 

 5-Day Event: December 16–21, 2019
 Buy-in: $10,400
 Number of Entrants: 1,035
 Total Prize Pool: $10,039,500
 Number of Payouts: 130
 Winning Hand:

Season 19 (XIX): WPT Five Diamond World Poker Classic 

 5-Day Event: December 15–19, 2021
 Buy-in: $10,400
 Number of Entrants: 716
 Total Prize Pool: $6,945,200
 Number of Payouts: 90
 Winning Hand:

Season 20 (XX): WPT Five Diamond World Poker Classic 

 5-Day Event: October 19-23, 2022
 Buy-in: $10,400
 Number of Entrants:  569
 Total Prize Pool:  $5,519,300
 Number of Payouts: 72
 Winning Hand:

Multiple final tables 
Both Antonio Esfandiari and Andrew Lichtenberger have made three final tables each. Esfandiari made three consecutive final tables from Season 9 (IX) to Season 11 (XI), while two of Lichtenberger's final tables came back-to-back in Season 10 (X) and Season 11 (XI).

Biggest payouts 
Below is a list of players that have cashed for over $1,000,000 at the WPT Five Diamond World Poker Classic in a single event.

References

External links
 Official website

Poker in Las Vegas
Television shows about poker
Recurring events established in 2002
Poker tournaments
World Poker Tour